The Second Battle of Tapae (101) was the decisive battle of the first Dacian War, in which Roman Emperor Trajan defeated the Dacian King Decebalus's army.  Other setbacks in the campaign delayed its completion until 102. The battle is most likely the battle-scene depicted on Plate 22 of Trajan's column.

Background
As soon as Trajan became Roman emperor, he planned a campaign against Dacia. This campaign resulted in the first Dacian war fought between 101 and 102.

The reason used for this campaign was Decebalus' lack of respect for the Romans, and the fact that he failed to respect the agreements of the peace reached following the First Battle of Tapae from 87/88.

Beside the nine Roman legions that were already stationed on the Danube frontier, Trajan brought two more, Legio X Gemina and Legio XI Claudia, and created two new legions, Legio II Traiana Fortis and Legio XXX Ulpia Victrix.

The battle
The Roman army crossed the Danube at Viminacium, slowly making its way into Dacia. Just like in 87/88, the battle took place at Tapae. The Dacians resisted the Roman offensive, but as a storm broke out, the Dacians believing it is a sign from the gods, decided to withdraw.

Aftermath
Because the winter was near, Trajan decided to wait until spring to continue his offensive on Sarmizegetusa. Decebalus took advantage of the new situation, and in the winter of 101 to 102, he attacked the Roman province of Moesia, a major clash taking place at the Battle of Adamclisi.

See also
 List of Roman battles
 Trajan's Dacian Wars
 Dacian warfare

References

Tapae 101
101
Tapae
Tapae
Ancient history of Transylvania